Livin' Large! is a 1991 comedy film starring Terrence "T.C." Carson, Lisa Arrindell Anderson, and Loretta Devine.

Plot 
Dexter Jackson (Carson) is a young, black deliveryman in Atlanta, Georgia, who aspires to become a news reporter. He gets what he considers his big break when he drives up to a hostage situation. When the reporter on the scene is killed, Dexter steps in and confronts the hostage-taker, who threatens to kill himself on live television. However, Dexter talks the man out of it, and ratings-obsessed executive producer Kate Penndragin (Blanche Baker) offers Dexter a reporter position at "News 4 Atlanta".

A recurring gag throughout the film involves Jackson seeing himself on TV with notably different facial features, i.e. thinner lips, straight hair, and a lighter complexion. As Kate tries to transform Dexter's urban image (mainly his dreadlocks, clothing, and vocabulary), he begins questioning whether he's starting to sell out as he becomes more and more successful. In other words, he wonders whether becoming successful also means becoming "white".

Although Dexter begins to fulfill his dream, he also starts forgetting where he came from and begins destroying his important relationships. He alienates those close to him with tabloid-style exposé stories, such as a local barber's illegal numbers racket and a restaurant's unhealthy cooking style. Dexter loses his fiancée, Toynelle (Arrindell Anderson), after a night on the town results in him spending the night with ditzy weather forecaster Missy Carnes (Julia Campbell). Dexter also betrays his best friend and narrator Baker Moon (Nathaniel 'Afrika' Hall) by revealing a local criminal's plan to commit grand theft auto, a plan Baker secretly confided to Dexter. As a result of the report, Baker winds up in the hospital.

After longtime anchor Clifford Worthy (Bernie McInerney) loses it on the air, Kate promotes Dexter to lead anchor and teams him with Missy, much to his chagrin. Kate also arranges a live marriage between the two, which she plans to exploit for ratings. However, in the end, Dexter comes to his senses and calls off the wedding, deciding to go back to Toynelle. Finally admitting his fault for the entire ordeal, he publicly apologizes to those he stepped over. Dexter finally (and truly) reaches his goal, becoming co-anchor at News 4 Atlanta, alongside Clifford Worthy.

Cast 
Terrence "T.C." Carson - Dexter Jackson 
Lisa Arrindell Anderson - Toynelle Davis 
Blanche Baker - Kate Penndragin
Nathaniel Hall - Baker Moon
Julia Campbell - Missy Carnes
Bernie McInerney - Clifford Worthy
Loretta Devine - Nadine Biggs
Ted Henning - Fabian Marks

Box office 
The movie was released September 20, 1991, in the US. It opened at #4 at the box office, grossing $2.1 million. Its total domestic gross was just under $5.5 million.

References

External links

1991 films
1991 comedy films
1990s English-language films
African-American comedy films
Films directed by Michael Schultz
Films scored by Herbie Hancock
The Samuel Goldwyn Company films
1990s American films